Dr. Henry Paul Meloche (November 1929 – August 1999) was a noted research biochemist who specialized in the field of enzyme stereochemistry.
He earned a Bachelor's degree from the University of Detroit and graduated from Michigan State University in 1956 with a Masters and PhD in Chemistry. He was a researcher at the Fox Chase Cancer Center in Philadelphia  (There he worked alongside Nobel Prize–winning scientists Irwin Rose, Baruch S. Blumberg.) and Papanicolaou Cancer Research Institute in Miami.

In his career, he published 52 peer-reviewed articles, according to Web of Science. The most cited was 
Meloche HP. "Bromopyruvate inactivation of 2-keto-3-deoxy-phosphogluconic aldolase. I. Kinetic Evidence for Active Site specificity" in Biochemistry 6 (8): 2273 1967, cited 211 times

1929 births
1999 deaths
American biochemists
University of Detroit Mercy alumni
Michigan State University alumni
Fox Chase Cancer Center people